Žunje is a village situated in Brus municipality in Serbia.

References

Populated places in Rasina District